Teridian Semiconductor Corporation (TSC) is a brand of mixed-signal ICs, primarily for energy-management markets, manufactured by Silergy Corporation, formerly owned by Maxim Integrated Products.

Products
Teridian metrology system-on-chip (SOC) solutions provide energy metering, measurement and control for the Smart Grid.

Other former Teridian products remain with Maxim Integrated, and included power-line communications, 10/100 Ethernet PHY, MAC+PHY, SFP Modules, VOIP FXO, PSTN soft modems with silicon DAA, smart-card interfaces and secure access controllers.

Brief history
The business unit has been in existence for more than thirty years.

It began as Silicon Systems of Tustin, in Tustin, CA. An unusual vision of the original business was to provide complete solutions, including analog, digital, firmware and any large-systems software and drivers. It was reorganized and sold to Texas Instruments, reorganized, then parts of the business were sold to TDK Corporation, which moved it to nearby Irvine, CA. Teridian Semiconductor was formed on April 8, 2005, in a leveraged buyout arranged by Golden Gate Capital, a venture capital firm. Maxim Integrated Products acquired Teridian Semiconductor in 2010. The Teridian energy measurement products group was sold to Silergy Corporation on March 18, 2016, with some personnel remaining with Maxim to support other products.

External links
Digitimes Article about Silergy's Acquisition of Teridian
Maxim announcement of acquisition

Semiconductor companies of the United States
Fabless semiconductor companies
Manufacturing companies based in Greater Los Angeles
Technology companies based in Greater Los Angeles
Companies based in Irvine, California
Electronics companies established in 2005
2005 establishments in California